Jagdish Raj Sapolia is an Indian politician and member of the Indian National Congress. Sapolia was a member of the Jammu and Kashmir Legislative Assembly from the Basohli constituency in Kathua district.

References 

People from Kathua district
Bharatiya Janata Party politicians from Jammu and Kashmir
Living people
21st-century Indian politicians
Indian National Congress politicians
Year of birth missing (living people)
Jammu and Kashmir MLAs 1987–1996
Jammu and Kashmir MLAs 2008–2014